Birnin Gwari is a Local Government Area in Kaduna State, Nigeria. Its headquarters are in the town of Birnin Gwari.

It has an area of 6,185 km and a population of 252,363 at the 2006 census.

The postal code of the area is 800.
Abdullahi Jariri was elected chairman of the local government in July 2018.

References

Local Government Areas in Kaduna State